The 1990–91 Northern Illinois Huskies men's basketball team represented Northern Illinois University in the college basketball season of 1990–91. The team, led by head coached by Jim Molinari, were members of the Mid-Continent Conference and played their homes game at the Chick Evans Field House. They finished the season 25–6, 14–2 in Mid-Con play, to win the Mid-Con regular season title. After falling to Wisconsin-Green Bay in the 1991 Mid-Con men's basketball tournament, they received an at-large invitation to the 1991 NCAA tournament.

Roster

Schedule and results

|-
!colspan=9 style=| Regular season

|-
!colspan=9 style=| Mid-Con Tournament

|-
!colspan=9 style=| NCAA Tournament

References

Northern Illinois Huskies men's basketball seasons
Northern Illinois
Northern Illinois Huskies men's basketball
Northern Illinois Huskies men's basketball
Northern Illinois